Southern Phone (also known as Southern Phone Company) is an Australian telecommunications company. It is located at Moruya, New South Wales. Southern Phone was established in 2002. It operated as an unlisted public company until December 2019.

History
In 2002, Southern Phone was formed by councils in New South Wales, Australia in order to extend affordable telecommunications into regional communities. The company received $4.77 million in initial funding from the Australian Government's Networking the Nation scheme. Local councils were shareholders, retaining profits in the community. Councils purchased two shares for $1 each. In 2017, Southern Phone had 35 shareholders including the Upper Lachlan Shire Council, Coffs Harbour City Council and Bellingen Shire Council.

Optus Satellite partnered with Southern Phone in October 2017 to launch the national broadband network (NBN) Sky Muster. Southern Phone uses the Optus 4G network, as well as parts of the Telstra 4G/3G network for its mobile services. By 2018, Southern Phone had delivered over $14.8 million in dividends to local councils with shares in the company.

References

2002 establishments in Australia
Australian companies established in 2002
Telecommunications companies of Australia
Companies based in New South Wales